The Haval Chitu is a compact crossover produced by Great Wall Motor under the Haval brand.

Overview

The Chitu was presented as the successor of the Haval F5 in February 2021. Sales of the Chitu started two months later at Auto Shanghai in China two months later.

The term Chitu is the Chinese word for "red hare" in English. This makes the Chitu, after the Big Dog, the second model of the brand to be named after an animal.

Powertrain

References

External links

Chitu
Cars introduced in 2021
Compact sport utility vehicles
Crossover sport utility vehicles
All-wheel-drive vehicles
Cars of China